The Herbert C. Hoover Building is the Washington, D.C. headquarters of the United States Department of Commerce.

The building is located at 1401 Constitution Avenue, Northwest, Washington, D.C., on the block bounded by Constitution Avenue NW to the south, Pennsylvania Avenue NW to the north, 15th Street NW to the west, and 14th Street NW to the east. It is located in the Federal Triangle, east of President's Park South (the Ellipse), north of the National Mall, and west of other Department of Commerce buildings, the John A. Wilson Building (District Building with the government of the District of Columbia / Washington, D.C.), and the Ronald Reagan Building. The building is owned by the General Services Administration.

Completed in 1932, it was renamed after Herbert Hoover in 1981. Hoover served as Secretary of Commerce (1921–1928) and later President (1929–1933). The closest Washington Metro station is Federal Triangle.

The White House Visitor Center (on the first floor) is in the Hoover Building.

History

The Department of Commerce was established after President William Howard Taft signed legislation creating the department on his last day in office, March 4, 1913, splitting the former Department of Commerce and Labor into the Department of Commerce and the Department of Labor.

In 1928, Congress authorized the purchase of land in what is now known as the Federal Triangle for departmental offices. The authorization was part of a wave of government construction; the 1926 Public Buildings Act permitted the government to hire private architects for the design of federal buildings, which led to large-scale construction of public buildings, including the development of the  Federal Triangle site between the Capitol and the White House.

Soon afterward Treasury Secretary Andrew W. Mellon and the Board of Architectural Consultants, composed of leading architects and headed by Edward H. Bennett of the Chicago architectural firm of Bennett, Parsons, and Frost, developed design guidelines for the site. Under Bennett's direction, each member of the board designed one of the buildings in the Federal Triangle complex to "provide each government agency or bureau with a building that would address its functional needs, while combining the individual buildings into a harmonious, monumental overall design expressive of the dignity and authority of the federal government." 
Louis Ayres, a member of the board, was selected as the architect for the Department of Commerce Building. Ayres, Arthur Brown Jr. (assigned to the Interstate Commerce Commission building, now one of the Environmental Protection Agency buildings) and William Adams Delano (assigned to the United States Post Office Department Building, now the William J. Clinton Federal Building) were charged with forming the west end of the Triangle and creating an open green mall.

Construction began on October 4, 1927, when Herbert Hoover was the Secretary of Commerce, and the cornerstone was laid on July 10, 1929, early in Hoover's presidential term. The building was renamed after Hoover in December 1981 by act of Congress. U.S. Representative Arlan Stangeland of Minnesota co-sponsored the bill and asked the House of Representatives to "pay tribute to this great Commerce Secretary," making no mention of Hoover's presidency, which was marked by the beginning of the Great Depression. Democratic Representative John G. Fary of Illinois, chairman of the House Subcommittee on Public Buildings and Grounds brought the bill up for consideration as a favor to Republicans. An aide was quoted as saying, "He was a little concerned what some people might think of him bringing up a bill to honor Herbert Hoover in the midst of a Republican recession." The building was officially dedicated as the Herbert C. Hoover Building on April 25, 1983, coinciding with the release of the first volume of George H. Nash's biography The Life of Herbert Hoover: The Engineer.

Only limited upgrades were made to the Herbert Hoover Building after 1932. By 2007, all other buildings in Federal Triangle had been renovated except the Herbert Hoover Building.

In 2007, the General Services Administration announced an eight-phase, 13-year, $960 million modernization and renovation of the Herbert Hoover Building. In part, the renovation will provide the building with a modern technology infrastructure, modern offices and energy-saving fixtures, and improved security. The National Capital Planning Commission (NCPC) approved the renovation project in 2007. The phases, each of which is to last 18 months, include:
Phase 1 — Construction of "swing space" to house staff while renovations occur; replacement of the HVAC system cooling towers on the roof.
Phase 2 — Renovation of the interior Corridor 1 (which runs parallel to Constitution Avenue NW); restoration of the entire exterior facade; and replacement of major utilities serving the building.
Phase 3 — Renovation of the interior and replacement of the roof on Corridor 2 (the second corridor north of Constitution Avenue NW).
Phase 4 — Renovation of the interior and replacement of the roof on Corridor 3 (the third corridor north of Constitution Avenue NW).
Phase 5 — Renovation of the interior and replacement of the roof on Corridor 4 (the fourth corridor north of Constitution Avenue NW).
Phase 6 — Renovation of the interior and replacement of the roof on Corridor 5 (the fifth corridor north of Constitution Avenue NW).
Phase 7 — Renovation of the interior and replacement of the roof on Corridor 6 (the sixth corridor north of Constitution Avenue NW).
Phase 8 — Renovation of the interior and replacement of the roof on Corridor 2 (the corridor parallel to Pennsylvania Avenue NW).
GSA's Federal Building Fund will contribute $605 million toward the renovation, while the Department of Commerce's contribution is $128 million. Another $225.6 million, provided by the American Recovery and Reinvestment Act of 2009, funded Phases 2 and 3. Both GSA and the Department of Commerce contributions are dependent upon annual congressional appropriations. The Great Recession provided GSA with $40 million in savings.

The project also proposed creating a new Constitution Avenue entrance for the National Aquarium. The NCPC approved this redesign in 2010.

By late 2012, however, budget cuts led to an indefinite delay in completing the project. Nonetheless, GSA pressed ahead with plans in February 2012 to create a more secure barrier around the Herbert Hoover Building. GSA proposed a steel cable barrier concealed by stone cladding, deep-buried steel piers, and collapsing sidewalks. Beautification elements included two reflecting pools along 14th Street NW, which would include public seating and Capital Bikeshare stations.

Design and art

It forms almost the entire west side of the Federal Triangle from Constitution Avenue to E Street. Flexible partitions rather than permanent walls were a part of the original design for many of the offices to allow for changes in departmental organization. The New York Times has described it as "sprawling."

The Malcolm Baldrige Great Hall (named after Howard M. Baldrige, Jr., Commerce Secretary 1981–1985 under Ronald Reagan) is located on the first floor of the north end of the building, facing Pennsylvania Avenue, houses the White House Visitor Center, operated by the National Park Service.

As part of the United States Bicentennial celebrations, the Great Hall became the Bicentennial Visitor Center in 1976 and until 1989 housed the Washington Tourist Information Center. Renovations began in July 1993 with the restoration of the ornate plaster ceiling to restore the simple elegance of the Great Hall. The original Indiana limestone walls, bronze doors, Vermont marble base and accent flooring, and Italianate bronze chandeliers were cleaned and refurbished. In March 1995 the White House Visitor Center was opened.

Aspects of other buildings built in Federal Triangle in the 1930s are present in the building, including courtyards (natural light and ventilation are provided to inner offices by six interior courtyards and a Neoclassical (Greek Revival) architectural style (a Doric colonnade on three sides).

The 15th Street facade stretches almost three city blocks and has four pedimented pavilions featuring pediment sculpture by James Earle Fraser and Haig Patigian. The National Aquarium was located in the basement and was open to the public since the building was completed in 1932 until 2013.

Also located inside the building is the Commerce Research Library, a Federal Agency Library which is open to the public but is used mainly by Commerce and other federal government employees and academics. The National Institute of Standards and Technology (NIST), National Oceanic and Atmospheric Administration (NOAA), and Census Bureau, all part of the Department of Commerce, maintain their own library collections.

Because the Census Bureau is a part of the Commerce Department, the official Population Clock at one point was located in the lobby of the Hoover Building. It briefly malfunctioned in 1982 when it showed some 50 million more Americans than estimated.  The clock now resides at the Census Bureau's headquarters in Suitland, Maryland.

National Aquarium in Washington, D.C. 

The National Aquarium in Washington, D.C. was an aquarium in Washington D.C. It was located in the Herbert C. Hoover Building that was moved to the building at its creation in 1932. It was the first free and public aquarium in the US. It closed on September 30, 2013 after Budget sequestration in 2013, having permanently lost its location due to the renovation of the Herbert C. Hoover Building. This was the first time that the Aquarium closed in the 140 years since its opening in 1873. The Museum is considering ways of opening at another location in Washington, D.C., but has no specific plans yet.

See also 
 Contributing property
 General Services Administration
 Old Post Office Pavilion
 National Aquarium in Washington, D.C.
 J. Edgar Hoover Building (F.B.I. Headquarters)

References

 This article incorporates text from the General Services Administration and National Park Service, which is public domain as a work of the United States federal government.

External links

 
 
Herbert Hoover Building (Commerce), Washington, DC at General Services Administration's historic buildings 
Three Stories About the Department of Commerce Building at Ghosts of DC

Commercial buildings completed in 1932
Buildings of the United States government in Washington, D.C.
Federal Triangle
Office buildings in Washington, D.C.
United States Department of Commerce
Greek Revival architecture in Washington, D.C.
Neoclassical architecture in Washington, D.C.
Office buildings on the National Register of Historic Places in Washington, D.C.
Government buildings on the National Register of Historic Places in Washington, D.C.
Historic district contributing properties in Washington, D.C.
1932 establishments in Washington, D.C.